Henry Addington, 1st Viscount Sidmouth,  (30 May 175715 February 1844) was an English Tory statesman who served as Prime Minister of the United Kingdom from 1801 to 1804.

Addington is best known for obtaining the Treaty of Amiens in 1802, an unfavourable peace with Napoleonic France which marked the end of the Second Coalition during the French Revolutionary Wars. When that treaty broke down he resumed the war, but he was without allies and conducted relatively weak defensive hostilities, ahead of what would become the War of the Third Coalition. He was forced from office in favour of William Pitt the Younger, who had preceded Addington as Prime Minister. Addington is also known for his reactionary crackdown on advocates of democratic reforms during a ten-year spell as Home Secretary from 1812 to 1822. He is the longest continuously serving holder of that office since it was created in 1782.

Family

Henry Addington was the son of Anthony Addington, Pitt the Elder's physician; and Mary Addington, the daughter of the Rev. Haviland John Hiley, headmaster of Reading School. As a consequence of his father's position, Addington was a childhood friend of William Pitt the Younger. Addington studied at Reading School, Winchester, and Brasenose College, Oxford, and then studied law at Lincoln's Inn. He married Ursula Mary Hammond in 1781; she brought an income of £1,000 a year into the marriage. The couple had eight children, of whom six survived to adulthood. Ursula Addington died in 1811; in 1823 Addington married a widow, Marianne Townsend, daughter of William Scott, 1st Baron Stowell.

Political career
He was elected to the House of Commons in 1784 as one of the Members of Parliament for Devizes, and became Speaker of the House of Commons in 1789. In March 1801, William Pitt the Younger resigned from office, ostensibly over the refusal of King George III to remove some of the existing political restrictions on Roman Catholics in Ireland (Catholic Emancipation), but poor health, failure in war, economic collapse, alarming levels of social unrest due to famine, and irreconcilable divisions within the Cabinet also played a role. Both Pitt and the King insisted that Addington take over as Prime Minister, despite his own objections, and his failed attempts to reconcile the King and Pitt.

Prime Minister

Foreign policy was the centrepiece of his term in office. Some historians have been highly critical and said that it was ignorant and indifferent to Britain's greatest needs. However, Thomas Goldsmith argues that Addington and Hawkesbury conducted a logical, consistent and eurocentric balance-of-power policy, rooted in rules and assumptions governing their conduct, rather than a chaotic free-for-all approach.

Addington's domestic reforms doubled the efficiency of the income tax. In foreign affairs, he secured the Treaty of Amiens in 1802. While the treaty's terms were the bare minimum that the British government could accept, Napoleon Bonaparte would not have agreed to any terms more favourable to the British, and the British government had reached a state of financial collapse from war expenditure, the loss of Continental markets for British goods and two successive failed harvests that had led to widespread famine and social unrest, rendering peace a necessity. 

By early 1803, Britain's financial and diplomatic positions had recovered sufficiently to allow Addington to declare war on France, when it became clear that the French would not allow a settlement for the defences of Malta that would have been secure enough to fend off a French invasion that appeared imminent.

At the time and ever since, Addington has been criticised for his lacklustre conduct of the war and his defensive posture. However, without allies, Britain's options were limited to defence. He increased the forces, provided a tax base that could finance an enlarged war and seized several French possessions. To gain allies, Addington cultivated better relations with Russia, Austria, and Prussia, which later culminated in the Third Coalition shortly after he left office. Addington also strengthened British defences against a French invasion through the building of Martello towers on the south coast and the raising of more than 600,000 men at arms.

Foundling Hospital
In 1802, Addington accepted an honorary position as vice-president for life on the Court of Governors of London's Foundling Hospital for abandoned babies.

Loss of office

Although the King stood by him, it was not enough, because Addington did not have a strong enough hold on both Houses of Parliament. By May 1804, partisan criticism of Addington's war policies provided the pretext for a parliamentary putsch by the three major factions (Grenvillites, Foxites, and Pittites), who had decided that they should replace Addington's ministry. Addington's greatest failing was his inability to manage a parliamentary majority by cultivating the loyal support of MPs beyond his own circle and the friends of the King. That, combined with his mediocre speaking ability, left him vulnerable to Pitt's mastery of parliamentary management and his unparallelled oratory skills. Pitt's parliamentary assault against Addington in March 1804 led to the slimming of his parliamentary majority to the point that defeat in the House of Commons was imminent.

Lord President and Lord Privy Seal
Addington remained an important political figure because he had gained a large following of MPs who supported him loyally in the Commons. He was reconciled with Pitt in December 1804, with the help of Lord Hawkesbury as an intermediary. As a result, Pitt arranged for him to join the Cabinet as Lord President of the Council in January 1805 but insisted for Addington to accept a peerage to avoid the inconvenience of them sitting together in the Commons and Addington was created Viscount Sidmouth, of Sidmouth in the County of Devon on 12 January 1805. 

In return for the support of the government by Addington's loyal supporters, Pitt agreed to include Addington's colleague the Earl of Buckinghamshire as Chancellor of the Duchy of Lancaster with a promise to elevate him to the first vacancy of a more senior position in the Cabinet. However, when Melville resigned as First Lord of the Admiralty in July 1805, Pitt broke his promise by having Sir Charles Middleton appointed instead of Buckinghamshire. As a result of the betrayal, Addington and Buckinghamshire resigned and took all of their supporters into opposition. Addington was appointed Lord Privy Seal in 1806 in the Ministry of All the Talents that succeeded Pitt. Later that year he returned to the position of Lord President to 1807. His resignation, in opposition to a limited measure of Catholic Emancipation, which the Cabinet was considering despite the opposition of King George III, precipitated the fall of the Talents Ministry.

Home Secretary
He returned to government again as Lord President in March 1812, and, in June of the same year, became Home Secretary. As Home Secretary, Addington countered revolutionary opposition, being responsible for the temporary suspension of habeas corpus in 1817 and the passage of the Six Acts in 1819. His tenure also saw the Peterloo Massacre of 1819. He left office in 1822, succeeded as Home Secretary by Sir Robert Peel, but Addington remained in the Cabinet as Minister without Portfolio for the next two years, opposing, along with the Duke of Wellington, other members of Cabinet, and King George IV, British recognition of the South American republics. He remained active in the House of Lords for the next few years, making his final speech in opposition to Catholic Emancipation in 1829 and casting his final vote against the Reform Act 1832.

Residences and land

Addington maintained homes at Upottery, Devon and Bulmershe Court, in what is now the Reading suburb of Woodley, but moved to the White Lodge in Richmond Park when he became Prime Minister. However, he maintained links with Woodley and the Reading area as commander of the Woodley Yeomanry Cavalry and High Steward of Reading. He also donated to the town of Reading the four acres of land that is today the site of the Royal Berkshire Hospital, and his name is commemorated in the town's Sidmouth Street and Addington Road as well as in Sidmouth Street in Devizes.

As Speaker of the House of Commons, from 1795 he had a residence in the Palace of Westminster, to the north-east of the House of Commons.

Death
Addington died in London on 15 February 1844 at the age of 86, from influenza, and was buried in the churchyard at St Mary the Virgin, Mortlake, now in Greater London.

Arms

Cabinet

Notes

References

External links
 
 
 
 Henry Addington, Viscount Sidmouth (1757–1844) at David Nash Ford's Royal Berkshire History Website
 Woodley House (Sonning) at David Nash Ford's Royal Berkshire History Website
 

|-

1757 births
1844 deaths
19th-century prime ministers of the United Kingdom
Alumni of Brasenose College, Oxford
British MPs 1780–1784
British MPs 1790–1796
British MPs 1796–1800
British Secretaries of State
Chancellors of the Exchequer of Great Britain
English Anglicans
Lord Presidents of the Council
Lords Privy Seal
Members of Lincoln's Inn
Members of the Parliament of Great Britain for constituencies in Wiltshire
Members of the Parliament of the United Kingdom for constituencies in Wiltshire
Members of the Privy Council of Great Britain
People educated at Winchester College
People educated at Reading School
People from Camden Town
People from Earley
People from Reading, Berkshire
Prime Ministers of the United Kingdom
Speakers of the House of Commons of Great Britain
Speakers of the House of Commons of the United Kingdom
Tory MPs (pre-1834)
UK MPs 1801–1802
UK MPs 1802–1806
UK MPs who were granted peerages
1
19th-century heads of government
Leaders of the House of Commons of the United Kingdom
Tory prime ministers of the United Kingdom
Peers of the United Kingdom created by George III
Residents of White Lodge, Richmond Park